David Einhorn (November 10, 1809November 2, 1879) was a German rabbi and leader of Reform Judaism in the United States.  Einhorn was chosen in 1855 as the first rabbi of the Har Sinai Congregation in Baltimore, the oldest congregation in the United States that has been affiliated with the Reform movement since its inception. While there, he created an early American prayer book for the congregation that became one of the progenitors of the 1894 Union Prayer Book. In 1861, Einhorn was forced to flee to Philadelphia, where he became rabbi of Reform Congregation Keneseth Israel. He moved to New York City in 1866, where he became rabbi of Congregation Adath Israel.

Early years
He was born in Diespeck, Kingdom of Bavaria, on November 10, 1809, to Maier and Karoline Einhorn. He was educated at the rabbinical school of Fürth, where he earned his rabbinical ordination at age 17. He then studied at the universities of Erlangen, Munich and Würzburg, where he studied from 1828 to 1834, supported by his mother following the death of his father.

Beliefs
He was a supporter of the principles of Abraham Geiger, and while still in Germany advocated the introduction of prayers in the vernacular German, the exclusion of messianistic hopes and the restoration of the Temple in Jerusalem and the sacrificial services there from the synagogue service, and other ritual modifications, lobbying on behalf of these changes at the 1844 Frankfurt Assembly. He was chosen Landesrabbiner of the Birkenfeld at Hoppstädten, and afterward Landesrabbiner of Mecklenburg-Schwerin in 1847, succeeding Rabbi Samuel Holdheim, whose views were a major influence on Einhorn. An incident in which he blessed an uncircumcised boy, which upset many of his more traditional congregants, led to his departure from Germany. He was called to Pest, Hungary, in 1851, where his views met with such opposition that the Emperor of Austria ordered his temple closed only two months after his arrival. The Emperor saw a connection between the Jewish reform movement and the Revolutions of 1848.

Emigration
Einhorn emigrated to the United States and was named on September 29, 1855, as the first rabbi of the Har Sinai Congregation in Baltimore. In that role, Einhorn formulated the Olat Tamid siddur for use in services, which became one of the models for the Union Prayer Book published in 1894 by the Central Conference of American Rabbis. Olat Tamid contrasted with Isaac Mayer Wise's Minhag America in particular by removing references to the status of Jews as a chosen people and eliminating references to the restoration of sacrificial services in the Temple.

Reform Judaism
Einhorn was an opponent of the Cleveland Conference of 1855 and its decision that the Talmud had primacy in interpreting the Torah. In this stand, Einhorn stood in contrast to Rabbi Wise's efforts to find language that could accommodate the various strands of Judaism in the United States, arguing that such efforts betrayed the progress of reform. In 1856, he started publishing a German-language monthly magazine, Sinai, devoted to radical Jewish reform, which he also used as a platform for his antislavery pronouncements. Einhorn remained an opponent of interfaith marriage, arguing in Sinai   that such practices were "a nail in the coffin of the small Jewish race", though he opposed the retention of practices such as the wearing of phylacteries, the limitations on activity prohibited on Shabbat, and kosher dietary laws, all of which he viewed as outmoded. Only those portions of the Torah that derived from a moral foundation were to be retained. He became the acknowledged leader of Reform Judaism in America, and in 1858 he published a revised prayer book, which formed the model for later revisions.

Views on slavery
In 1861, Einhorn delivered a sermon as a response to a sermon by Morris Jacob Raphall that supported the existence of slavery, which Einhorn called a "deplorable farce" and argued that the institution of slavery in the South was inconsistent with Jewish values. He noted that the Jewish experience as slaves in Egypt as a reason that Jews should be more sensitive to the plight of slaves. He staunchly advocated this position, despite the fact that many of his congregants and colleagues were sympathetic to slavery in what was then a slave state, Maryland. In his sermon titled War on Amalek, based on Exodus 17, Einhorn stated that "We are told that this crime [slavery] rests upon a historical right! ... Slavery is an institution sanctioned by the Bible, hence war against it is war against, and not for, God! It has ever been a strategy of the advocate of a bad cause to take refuge from the spirit of the Bible to its letter." A riot broke out in response to his sermon on April 19, 1861, in which the mob sought to tar and feather the rabbi. Einhorn fled to Philadelphia where he became spiritual leader of Congregation Keneseth Israel.

Retirement
In 1866 he moved to New York City, where he became the inaugural rabbi of Congregation Adas Jeshurun on 39th Street, which merged with Congregation Ansche Chesed in 1873, adopted the new name Congregation Beth-El, and built a new structure on 63rd Street. Einhorn retained the position as spiritual leader of the merged synagogue, delivering his final sermon on July 12, 1879, after which the congregation agreed to bestow upon him a pension of $3,500. Upon his retirement, Einhorn was recognized across denominations by his fellow rabbis; at a farewell ceremony held at his apartment (at his request, because of his health) he was presented with a resolution adopted at the convention of the Union of American Hebrew Congregations, that recognized Einhorn for his rabbinic service, noting the "ability and character which have marked his career, and the earnestness, honesty and zeal which have animated the heart of a man whom we proudly recognize as one of Israel's purest champions and noblest teachers." He died 4 months later.

Death
Einhorn died of old age on November 2, 1879, at his home on East 64th Street. He was 69, and had become increasingly feeble and unable to leave his room. His funeral was held before a packed house at Beth-El on November 6, 1879, where his plain coffin was carried into the synagogue by 12 pallbearers and placed before the pulpit. Attending were such rabbinic notables as Richard James Horatio Gottheil of Congregation Emanu-El, Einhorn's son-in-law and successor Kaufmann Kohler of Beth-El, another son-in-law, Emil G. Hirsch, of Louisville, Kentucky, along with representatives of the congregations he served in Baltimore and Philadelphia. He was buried at Machpelah Cemetery, near the Jackie Robinson Parkway.

References

Sources

External links
JewishEncyclopedia
Abolitionist Rabbi David Einhorn Carte-de-Visite, circa 1855-1861 Shapell Manuscript Foundation
Highbeam entry
The Columbia Electronic Encyclopedia, 2003
The Columbia Encyclopedia, Sixth Edition.  2001
 David Einhorn: Das vom Judenthum gebotene Verhalten des Israeliten gegenüber seiner stiefväterlichen Behandlung von Seiten des Vaterlandes. Predigt, am 13. November 1847 in der Synagoge zu Schwerin gehalten Schwerin: Kürschner 1847  Original (German)
Einhorn's reply to Raphall, condemning slavery

1809 births
1879 deaths
Burials at Green-Wood Cemetery
American abolitionists
American people of German-Jewish descent
American Reform rabbis
German emigrants to the United States
German Reform rabbis
University of Würzburg alumni
Ludwig Maximilian University of Munich alumni
Tarring and feathering in the United States
19th-century American rabbis